Serzha Lyfaria (from 2000 to 2008, Saburova, from 2008 to 2019, Oleksandra Saburova) is a station on the Livoberezhna Line of the Kyiv Light Rail system. It was opened on May 26, 2000 and reopened after a significant modernization of the line on October 26, 2012.

Serzha Lyfaria is located in between the Maryny Tsvetaievoi and Teodora Draizera stations. Initially named in honor of Alexander Saburov, a Soviet partisan, it was renamed in 2019 in honor of Serge Lifar, a French ballet dancer and choreographer of Ukrainian origin.

References

External links
 
 

Kyiv Light Rail stations
Railway stations opened in 2000
2000 establishments in Ukraine